William Warde Fowler (16 May 1847 – 15 June 1921) was an English historian and ornithologist, and tutor at Lincoln College, Oxford. He was best known for his works on ancient Roman religion.

Among his most influential works was The Roman Festivals of the Period of the Republic (1899). H. H. Scullard, in the introduction to his 1981 book on a similar topic, singled out Fowler's book as a particularly valuable resource despite its age, writing, "I have not been so presumptuous as to attempt to provide an alternative."

References

External links

 
 
 
The City-State of the Greeks and Romans: a survey introductory to the study of Ancient History (1895) 
Julius Caesar and the Foundation of the Roman Imperial System (1903)
Rome Home University Library (1912)
Roman Ideas of Deity in the last century before the Christian Era Oxford lectures (1914) 
Roman Essays and Interpretations (1920)

"Kingham, old and new, studies in a rural parish" by W. Warde Fowler, 1913
"Obituary. W. Warde-Fowler" by Julian Huxley, from British Birds, Vol 15, No. 6 pp. 143–144

1847 births
1921 deaths
Alumni of Lincoln College, Oxford
British ornithological writers
English classical scholars
English ornithologists
Fellows of Lincoln College, Oxford
People educated at Marlborough College